Hunan is a town under the administration of Changle District, Fuzhou, Fujian, China. , it has one residential community and 10 villages under its administration.

References 

Township-level divisions of Fujian
Fuzhou